USS Pivot is a name used more than once by the United States Navy:

 , a fleet minesweeper commissioned 12 July 1944.
 , a fleet minesweeper commissioned 12 July 1954.

United States Navy ship names